The French Football Federation ( FFF and 3F) is the governing body of football in France. It was formed in 1919 and is based in the capital, Paris. The FFF was a founding member of FIFA and is responsible for overseeing all aspects of the game of football in France, both professional and amateur. The French Football Federation is a founding member of UEFA and joined FIFA in 1907 after replacing the USFSA, who were founding members.

History

Background 

Before the FFF was established, football, rugby union and others sports in France were regulated by the Union des Sociétés Françaises de Sports Athlétiques (USFSA). Founded in November 1890, the USFSA was initially headquartered in Paris but its membership soon expanded to include sports clubs from throughout France.

In 1894 the USFSA also organised the first recognised French football championship. The first competition featured just four Paris teams and was organised on a knockout basis.

In 1900 the USFSA sent players from Parisian Club Français to represent France at the 1900 Summer Olympics. On 1 May 1904 the USFSA also selected the first official France national football team. The USFSA would be dissolved in 1919 after some disagreements with FIFA.

Formation and evolution 
The Fédération Française de Football was formed on 7 April 1919 following the transformation of the Comité Français Interfédéral (CFI) into the Fédération Française de Football Association (FFFA). The CFI were seen as a rival organization to the Union des Sociétés Françaises de Sports Athlétiques (USFSA) due to the organization's constantly disagreeing with each other, mainly due to the latter's opposition to professionalism in sport. Following the debacle at the 1908 Summer Olympics, in which France sent two teams, one controlled by the USFSA and another by FIFA, the CFI ruled that FIFA would now be responsible for the club's appearances in forthcoming Olympic Games and not the USFSA. Being a founding member of the International Olympic Committee (IOC), the USFSA disagreed with the ruling and, despite having three years to reach an agreement, the CFI and the USFSA failed to, which led to France not sending a football team to the 1912 Summer Olympics. The USFSA later developed friction with FIFA and the IOC, which led to disorganization and in 1913, became semi-affiliated with the CFI.

On 7 April 1919, the CFI transformed themselves into the Fédération Française de Football with Jules Rimet being installed as the federation's first president. Its legal status is placed under the French Association loi de 1901 jurisdiction (Voluntary association). The FFF has been affiliated to FIFA since 1907, when the CFI succeeded the USFSA as France's representative. Two years later after the CFI's transformation, the USFSA officially merged with the federation.

On 28 June 2010, the federation's current president, Jean-Pierre Escalettes, announced his resignation from his position effective 23 July. On 23 July, Fernand Duchaussoy was installed as the federation's interim president and, on 18 December, the title was removed making him the federation's 11th president in its history. On 18 June 2011, following as election, Nöel Le Graët was named as the federation's 12th president.

Activities 
The French Football Federation describes itself in these four roles:

 To organize, develop, and monitor the teachings and practices of football in all its forms on the mainland and in the overseas departments and territories (Guadeloupe, French Guiana, Martinique, Mayotte, New Caledonia, French Polynesia and Réunion).
 To create and maintain a link between its individual members, affiliated clubs, and their respective districts and regional leagues of the Ligue du Football Amateur (LFA) and the Ligue de Football Professionnel (LFP).
 To defend the moral and material interests of French football.
 To maintain all appropriate relations with foreign associations affiliated with FIFA, as well as their sporting organizations and national governments.

The FFF sanctions all competitive football matches in France, either directly, beginning with the Championnat National on down, or indirectly through the Ligue de Football Professionnel, who manage Ligue 1 and Ligue 2, the first and second divisions of France, respectively, as well as the Coupe de la Ligue. The LFP, however, still operate under the authority of the federation. The federation is also responsible for appointing the management of the men's, women's and youth national football teams. In 2010, the FFF had 2,107,924 licenses, with over 1,800,000 registered players and 18,000 registered clubs. The federation unveiled its new crest (above right) in 2007.

The French Football Federation runs numerous competitions, the most famous of which is the annual Coupe de France. The Coupe de France is managed under the authority of the Federal Commission of the Coupe de France, which is directly attached to the Federal Council of the FFF. The federation also organizes the championships of the semi-professional and amateur leagues, such as the Championnat National, the Championnat de France amateur and Championnat de France amateur 2, and the regional and departmental leagues, as well as the latter's cup competitions.

The federation also governs youth leagues, such as the Championnat National of the under-19s and under-17s. The FFF also oversee the organization of the Coupe Gambardella and the Coupe Nationale for the under-15 and under-13 club teams. The federation organizes all three divisions of women's football in France and oversee the Challenge de France, the women's premier cup competition.

Executive Committee

Academies 
The French Football Force operates 14 élite academies throughout the country of France, the most famous being Le Centre Technique National Fernand Sastre, or simply Clairefontaine, which was created by former FFF president Fernand Sastre in 1976. Located 50 km southwest of Paris in Clairefontaine-en-Yvelines, Clairefontaine is arguably the finest football academy in the world. It has a high reputation of producing some of the most gifted French players including Nicolas Anelka, Louis Saha, William Gallas and national team top scorer Thierry Henry.

Registration 
Players selected to an academy must be at least 13 years of age, have French citizenship, and be living and playing within the region of the academy the player is registering for. Registration for new players at an academy normally begins in October the year before players enroll at the academy when prospective applicants are 12 years of age. Players have until December to register with their club for acceptance into the academy. The first set of trials are carried out by each district within its respective region. Each district selects a set number of players who will traveled to the region's academy to attend a tryout, which is usually held over a three-day period. The dates of the tryouts vary depending on the academy. The Clairefontaine academy normally hold its tryouts during the Easter school holidays, however the academy in Châteauroux holds its tryouts in June. After the three days, the academy director and officials will convene to select a maximum of 22 players with three or four of the 22 being goalkeepers. The number of players selected also vary depending on the academy.

Training and accommodation 
Players who are selected to attend an academy stay and train at the facilities from Monday through Friday. Players are given the weekend off to go and visit family and, also, to train and play with their parent clubs. They are given school holidays off, as well. Players are also required to meet educational criteria. For example, players age 13–15 training at Clairefontaine attend the Collège Catherine de Vivonne de Rambouilet in Rambouillet. After departing Rambouilet, players enroll at the nearby high school Lycée Louis Bascan de Rambouillet with hopes that they will earn their Baccalauréat. All costs required to attend an academy are borne by the federation and the Ligue Nationale de Football.

Honours

National football team

National youth teams

Sponsors 

 Nike, Inc.
 Crédit Agricole
 Électricité de France
 Volkswagen
 PMU
 KFC
 Accor Hotels
 Carrefour

See also 
 Union des Sociétés Françaises de Sports Athlétiques, FFF predecessor

References

External links

Official site 
 France at FIFA site
 France at UEFA site

France
 
Futsal in France
Football
1919 establishments in France
Sports organizations established in 1919
Organizations based in Paris
1919 establishments in Paris